Cathleen McGuigan is the Editor in Chief of the American magazine Architectural Record. She joined to company in 2011 after being an architecture critic and arts editor at Newsweek. Her work has also been published in The New York Times Magazine, Smithsonian, Harper's Bazaar, and ''Rolling Stone. She was professor at Columbia University's Graduate School of Journalism.

References

American magazine editors
Women magazine editors
Architecture critics
Year of birth missing (living people)
Living people
Place of birth missing (living people)
Architecture writers
American architecture writers